The Tremaine Bridge is a historic structure located south of Webster City, Iowa, United States. In April 1902 the Hamilton County Board of Supervisors contracted with N.M. Stark and Company from Des Moines to design and build the new bridge in Independence Township for $3,600. The Carnegie Steel Company of Pittsburgh provided the steel. The Camelback through truss bridge was completed later in 1902. It was listed on the National Register of Historic Places in 1998.

References

Bridges completed in 1902
Transportation buildings and structures in Hamilton County, Iowa
National Register of Historic Places in Hamilton County, Iowa
Road bridges on the National Register of Historic Places in Iowa
Truss bridges in the United States
Steel bridges in the United States